Muriqan is a settlement in the former Ana e Malit municipality, Shkodër County, northwestern Albania. At the 2015 local government reform it became part of the municipality Shkodër. Near this village a jointly managed border crossing point with Montenegro is situated.

References

Ana e Malit
Albania–Montenegro border crossings
Populated places in Shkodër
Villages in Shkodër County